Ancema blanka, the silver royal, is a species of lycaenid or blue butterfly found in the Indomalayan realm. The species was first described by Lionel de Nicéville in 1894.

Description

Lionel de Nicéville described this species in 1894 as:

Subspecies
A. b. blanka North India, Sikkim - Assam, Myanmar, Sumatra
A. b. minturna (Fruhstorfer, 1912) Thailand, Laos, Sikkim, Assam, Bhutan
A. b. nacandra (Fruhstorfer, 1912) Java
A. b. sudica (Evans, 1926) South India
A. b. reina Schröder & Treadaway, 1998

Habits
They fly very fast. During summers, the male occasionally comes to water but usually keeps to the treetops and rocks, especially on the summit of hills, where they basks in the sun with the wings half open. Silver royals can sometimes be seen sitting on the dung of animals and by the sides of small streams and waterfalls. Females are rarely seen.

References

External links
 With images.

Remelanini
Butterflies of Asia
Butterflies of Singapore
Butterflies described in 1894